Henri Saint-Pierre-Lespéret (3 August 1761 – 21 January 1847) was a French politician. He served as a member of the Corps législatif from 1799 to 1811, representing Gers.

Early life
Henri Saint-Pierre-Lespéret was born on 3 August 1761 in Plaisance, Gers. His father, Dominique Saint-Pierre, was a lawyer in the local parliament. His mother was Lady Jeanne Ducuing.

Career
Saint-Pierre-Lespéret was sent to jail during the Reign of Terror, when he shared a cell with André Chénier. He served as a member of the Corps législatif from 1799 to 1811, representing Gers.

Death and legacy
Saint-Pierre-Lespéret died on 21 January 1847 in his hometown of Plaisance. One of his daughters married General Antoine Noguès.

References

1761 births
1847 deaths
People from Gers
Members of the Corps législatif